The Food and Fertilizer Technology Center for the Asian and Pacific Region was established by treaty in Kawana, Japan on 11 June 1969.

The center is based in Taipei, the current members are: Japan, Taiwan, South Korea, the Philippines, Vietnam, Malaysia, and Thailand with Indonesia as an observer.  Previous members included Australia, Laos and New Zealand.

The center publishes a technical bulletin.

References

Treaties of Australia
Treaties of New Zealand
Treaties of Laos
Treaties of Japan
Treaties of Taiwan
Treaties of Malaysia
Treaties of Vietnam
Treaties of the Philippines
Treaties of Thailand
Treaties of South Korea
Treaties concluded in 1969
Treaties entered into force in 1969